Khanabad is a small village located in Hunza district, Gilgit-Baltistan, in Pakistan.  There is a school created by Aga Khan Education Service called Diamond Jubilee Middle School.  Most people in Khanabad are Ismaili Shia and are of Burusho ethnicity.  There is also a suspension bridge in Khanabad.

References 

Villages in Pakistan